Aspidosperma macrocarpon is a timber tree native to Brazil. This plant is cited in Flora Brasiliensis by Carl Friedrich Philipp von Martius.

External links
 Flora Brasiliensis: Aspidosperma discolor

discolor
Trees of Brazil